Club-E Collection is a mini-album by popular children's entertainers Sharon, Lois & Bram, originally released in 1994. The album features eight of Sharon, Lois & Bram's previously recorded songs. It was produced to promote their holiday concert tour, All the Holiday Fun You Can Sing! which began shortly after the trio's run on Broadway.  

Club-E Collection was only released on cassette. The inside foldout contains information about Candles, Snow & Mistletoe and their 1995 CD-ROM game titled CyberBoogie! It also features tour dates for the concert tour, as well as a small clip-out mini poster promoting the tour. 

In 1995, Club-E Collection was picked up by Gap Kids and sold in Gap Kids stores across North America. The album featured the same eight songs as the original release, but the songs were rearranged on the album. The inside foldout did not promote their holiday tour.

Track listing
(on original release)
"Chugga-Chugga"
"Five Little Monkeys"
"Peanut Butter & Jelly"
"Hey Dum Diddeley Dum"
"One Elephant, Deux Elephants"
"Tingalayo"
"Don't Bring An Elephant (to a Family meal)"
"Skinnamarink"

Songs 1,3,4,5 & 6 from: Great Big Hits
Song 2 from: One, Two, Three, Four, Live!
Song 7 from: Candles Long Ago
Song 8 from: Sharon, Lois & Bram's Elephant Show Record

Sharon, Lois & Bram albums
1994 compilation albums